HAT-P-5b is a transiting extrasolar planet located approximately 1000 light-years away in the constellation of Lyra, orbiting the star HAT-P-5. It is a hot Jupiter with a mass 6% greater than Jupiter and a radius 26% greater than Jupiter, corresponding to a density of 0.66 g/cm3, which is less than water. This planet was found by Bakos et al. on October 9, 2007.

The planet HAT-P-5b is named Kráľomoc. The name was selected in the NameExoWorlds campaign by Slovakia, during the 100th anniversary of the IAU. Kráľomoc is an ancient Slovak term for the planet Jupiter.

Physical properties
The measured temperature on the planetary dayside is 1485 K.

See also
 HAT-P-4b
 HAT-P-6b

References

External links

 

Exoplanets discovered by HATNet
Hot Jupiters
Transiting exoplanets
Exoplanets discovered in 2007
Giant planets
Lyra (constellation)
Exoplanets with proper names